The Nordperd (Perd = Slavic for protrusion or prominence) is a cape on the German Baltic Sea island of Rügen. It is part of the Southeast Rügen Biosphere Reserve and the Mönchgut Nature Reserve.

The cape forms the eastern point of the island of Rügen and the district of Vorpommern-Rügen. The Nordperd has been protected by coastal defence measures and is thus relatively unaffected by the normal active processes of a graded shoreline.

Its terrain typically consists of dry grasslands, sycamore-ash woods on the cliff slopes and beaches and shallow waterbodies.

The northern section of beach, with a spa promenade at the Baltic Sea coastal resort Göhren, is separated by Cape Nordperd from the beach at Göhren running southwards.

The counterpart to the Nordperd is the Südperd, the southeast tip of Rügen in the municipality of Thiessow.

External links 
 Nordperd on the website of the municipality of Göhren

Footnotes 

Headlands of Germany
Geography of Rügen
Göhren, Rügen
Mönchgut
Landforms of Mecklenburg-Western Pomerania